Thomas Macpherson is the name of:
Thomas Macpherson, 1st Baron Macpherson of Drumochter (1888–1965), Labour Party politician
Tommy Macpherson (1920–2014), Scottish businessman and soldier from Biallid
Thomas Henry Macpherson (1842–1903), Canadian merchant and politician

See also
Thomas McPherson (disambiguation)